Rosemary Pauline West (née Letts; born 29 November 1953) is an English serial killer who collaborated with her husband, Fred West, in the torture and murder of at least nine young women between 1973 and 1987; she also murdered her eight-year-old stepdaughter Charmaine in 1971. The majority of these murders took place at the West residence in Gloucester. Rose is currently an inmate at HM Prison New Hall, Flockton, West Yorkshire, after being convicted in 1995 of ten murders; Fred died by suicide in prison that same year while awaiting trial, following the couple's arrest in 1994.

Background
Rosemary Letts was born in Northam, Devon, to William Andrew "Bill" Letts (25 February 1921 – 24 May 1979) and Daisy Gwendoline Fuller (1919–2020) after a difficult pregnancy. She was the fifth of seven children born into a poor family. Rose's mother suffered from depression and was given electroconvulsive therapy (ECT) while pregnant; some have argued that this treatment may have caused prenatal developmental injuries to her daughter. A few days before Rose was born, Daisy had ECT. Rose grew up into a moody and precocious teenager, prone to daydreaming and performing poorly at school.

Rose's parents separated when she was a teenager. She lived with her mother and attended Cleeve School for six months, later moving in with her father at the age of 16 in Bishop's Cleeve, near Cheltenham, Gloucestershire; her father, who suffered from paranoid schizophrenia, was prone to extreme violence and repeatedly sexually abused Rose and her oldest sister Patricia.

At the onset of puberty, Rose, reportedly fascinated by her developing body, would deliberately parade naked or semi-naked around the house in the presence of her younger brother, Graham (born 1957). On numerous occasions, at the age of 13, she would also creep into nine-year-old Graham's bed at nightfall and molest him and her youngest brother Gordon.

Meeting Fred West

Rose first encountered Fred West in early 1969, shortly after her 15th birthday; he was 27. The pair first met at a Cheltenham bus stop. Initially, Rose was repulsed by Fred's unkempt appearance but quickly became flattered by the attention he continued to lavish on her over the following days as he invariably sat alongside her at the same bus stop. Rose twice refused to go on a date with Fred, but allowed him to accompany her home.

Having discovered Rose worked in a nearby bread shop, a few days after their first encounter, Fred persuaded an unknown woman to enter the premises and present her with a gift accompanied by the explanation that a "man outside" had asked her to present this gift to her. Minutes later, Fred entered the premises and asked Rose to accompany him on a date that evening, an offer she accepted. Shortly thereafter, Rose began a relationship with Fred, becoming a frequent visitor at the caravan park where he lived with the two children from his first marriage, daughter Anna Marie and stepdaughter Charmaine. Rose became a willing childminder to Fred's daughters, who she noted were neglected and whom she initially treated with care and affection. On several occasions in the early days of their courtship, Rose insisted she and Fred take the girls on excursions to gather wildflowers.

Within weeks of her first meeting Fred, Rose left her job at the bread shop in order to become full-time nanny to Charmaine and Anna Marie; this decision was made with the agreement that Fred would provide her with sufficient money to give to her parents on Fridays to convince them she was still obtaining a salary at the bread shop. Several months later, Rose introduced Fred to her family, who were aghast at their daughter's choice of partner. Rose's mother, Daisy Letts, was unimpressed with Fred's boastful and arrogant behaviour, and correctly concluded he was a pathological liar. Her father vehemently disapproved of the relationship, threatening Fred directly and promising to call social services if he continued to associate with his daughter.

Relationship
Rose's parents forbade their daughter from continuing to date Fred, but she defied their wishes, prompting them to visit Gloucestershire social services to explain that their 15-year-old daughter was having a sexual relationship with an older man, and that they had heard rumours that she had begun to engage in prostitution at Fred's caravan. In response, Rose was placed in a home for troubled teenagers in Cheltenham in August 1969, and only permitted to leave under controlled conditions. When allowed to return home to visit her parents at weekends, Rose almost invariably took the opportunity to visit Fred.

On her 16th birthday, Rose left the home for troubled teenagers to return to her parents while Fred was serving a thirty-day sentence for theft and unpaid fines. Upon Fred's release, Rose left her parents' home to move into the Cheltenham flat he then lived in. Shortly thereafter, Fred collected Charmaine and Anna Marie from social services. Rose's father made one final effort to prevent his daughter from seeing Fred, and Rose was examined by a police surgeon in February 1970, who confirmed she was pregnant. In response, Rose was again placed into care but was discharged on 6 March on the understanding she would terminate her pregnancy and return to her family. Instead, Rose opted to live with Fred, resulting in her father forbidding his daughter from ever again setting foot in his household.

Three months later, the couple vacated the Cheltenham flat and relocated to the ground floor flat of a two-storey house at Midland Road in Gloucester. On 17 October 1970, Rose gave birth to their first child: a daughter they named Heather Ann (speculation remains that Heather may have been sired by Rose's own father). Two months later, Fred was imprisoned for the theft of car tyres and a vehicle tax disc. He remained imprisoned until 24 June 1971. As he served this six-and-a-half-month sentence, Rose, having just turned 17, looked after the three girls, with Charmaine and Anna Marie being told to refer to Rose as their mother.

According to Anna Marie, she and Charmaine were frequently subjected to physical and emotional abuse throughout the time they lived under Rose's care at Midland Road, but although Anna Marie was generally submissive and prone to display emotion in response to the abuse, Charmaine repeatedly infuriated Rose by her stoic refusal to either cry or display any sign of grief or servitude no matter how severely she was treated. Despite the years of neglect and abuse, Charmaine's spirit had not been broken and she talked wistfully to Anna Marie of the belief she held that her "mummy will come and save me". Anna Marie later recollected her sister repeatedly antagonised Rose by making statements such as: "My real mummy wouldn't swear or shout at us" in response to Rose's scathing language. A childhood friend of Charmaine's named Tracey Giles, who had lived in the upper flat of Midland Road, would later recollect an incident in which she had entered the Wests' flat unannounced only to see Charmaine, naked and standing upon a chair, gagged and with her hands bound behind her back with a belt, as Rose stood alongside the child with a large wooden spoon in her hand. According to Giles, Charmaine had been "calm and unconcerned", while Anna Marie had been standing by the door with a blank expression on her face.

Hospital records reveal Charmaine had received treatment for a severe puncture wound to her left ankle in the casualty unit of the Gloucester Royal Hospital on 28 March 1971. This incident was explained by Rose to have resulted from a household accident.

Murder of Charmaine West
Rose is believed to have killed Charmaine shortly before Fred's prison release date of 24 June 1971. She is known to have taken Charmaine, Anna Marie and Heather to visit Fred on 15 June. It is believed to be on or very shortly after this date that Charmaine was murdered. As well as forensic odontology confirmation that Charmaine had died while Fred was still incarcerated, further testimony from Tracey Giles's mother, Shirley, corroborated the fact that Charmaine had been murdered before Fred's release. In her later testimony at Rose's trial, Shirley stated that, while her family had lived in the upper flat of 25 Midland Road in 1971, her two daughters had been playmates of Charmaine and Anna Marie. Shirley further stated that after her family had vacated the upper flat in April 1971, she had brought Tracey to visit Charmaine on one day in June, only for Tracey to be told by Rose: "She's gone to live with her mother, and bloody good riddance!" before Tracey began to weep.

As with the Giles family, Rose explained Charmaine's disappearance to others who enquired about her whereabouts by claiming that Fred's first wife, Catherine "Rena" West, had called and taken her eldest daughter to live with her in Bristol. She informed staff at Charmaine's primary school that the child had moved with her mother to London. When Fred was released from prison on 24 June, he allayed Anna Marie's concerns for her sister's whereabouts by claiming her mother Rena had collected Charmaine and returned to her native Scotland. In her autobiography, Out of the Shadows, Anna Mariewho was of full English ethnicity while Charmaine was of part-Asian ethnicityrecollects that when she asked why her mother had collected Charmaine but not her, Fred callously replied: "She wouldn't want you, love. You're the wrong colour."

Charmaine's body was initially stowed in the coal cellar of Midland Road until Fred was released from prison. He later buried her naked body in the yard close to the back door of the flat, and he remained adamant he had not dismembered her. A subsequent post-mortem suggested the body had been severed at the hip; this damage may have been caused by building work Fred conducted at the property in 1976. Several bonesparticularly patellae, finger, wrist, toe and ankle boneswere missing from Charmaine's skeleton, leading to the speculation the missing parts had been retained as keepsakes (this proved to be a distinctive discovery in all the autopsies of the victims exhumed in 1994).

Murder of Catherine "Rena" West
Rena maintained sporadic contact with her children on each occasion she and Fred separated. She is also known to have visited Fred's family in Much Marcle, Herefordshire, to enquire as to her children's whereabouts and welfare in the latter half of August 1971. Fred's sister-in-law, Christine, later recollected Rena was depressed and extremely anxious about her children's welfare. Being provided with Fred's Midland Road address, Rena sought to confront himlikely to discuss or demand custody of her daughters. This was the final time Rena was seen alive. She is believed to have been murdered by strangulation, possibly in the back seat of Fred's Ford Popular and likely while intoxicated. When Rena's body was discovered, a short length of metal tubing was found with her remains, leaving open a possibility she had been restrained and subjected to a sexual assault prior to her murder. The body was extensively dismembered, placed into plastic bags, and buried close to a cluster of trees, known as Yewtree Coppice, at Letterbox Field.

Marriage
On 29 January 1972, Fred and Rose married. The ceremony took place at Gloucester Register Office, with Fred falsely describing himself as a bachelor on the marriage certificate. No family or friends were invited.

Several months later, with Rose pregnant with her second child, the couple moved from Midland Road to an address nearby: 25 Cromwell Street. Initially, the three-storey home, located close to Gloucester city centre, was rented from the council; Fred later purchased the property from the council for £7,000. To facilitate the Wests' purchasing the property from the council, many of the upper floor rooms were initially converted into bedsits to supplement the household income. To maintain a degree of privacy for his own family, Fred installed a cooker and a washbasin on the first-floor landing in order that their lodgers need not enter the ground floor where the West family lived, and only he and his family were permitted access to the garden of the property.

On 1 June, Rose gave birth to a second daughter. The date of her birth led Fred and Rose to name the child Mae June.

Prostitution
Shortly after giving birth to her second child, Rose began to work as a prostitute, operating from an upstairs room at their residence and advertising her services in a local contact magazine. Fred encouraged Rose to seek clients in Gloucester's West Indian community through these advertisements. In addition to her prostitution, Rose engaged in casual sex with both male and female lodgers within their household, and individuals Fred encountered via his work; she also bragged to several people that no man or woman could completely satisfy her. When engaging in sexual relations with women, Rose would gradually increase the level of brutality to which she subjected her partner with acts such as partially suffocating her partner or inserting increasingly large dildos into her partner's body. If the woman resisted or expressed any pain or fear, this would greatly excite Rose, who would typically ask: "Aren't you woman enough to take it?"

To many of these women, it became apparent Rose and her husband (who regularly participated in threesomes with his wife and her lovers) took a particular pleasure from seeking to take women beyond their sexual limitstypically via sessions involving bondage, as the Wests openly admitted to taking a particular pleasure from any form of sex involving a strong measure of dominance, pain and violence. To cater to these fetishes, they amassed a large collection of bondage and restraining devices, magazines and photographs, later expanding this collection to include videos depicting bestiality and graphic child sexual abuse.

Rose controlled the West family finances, with Fred giving her his pay packets. The room Rose used for prostitution was known throughout the West household as "Mandy's Room" (Mandy being the working name she chose for when she was with her clients), and had several hidden peepholes allowing Freda longtime voyeurto watch her entertain her clients. Fred also installed a baby monitor in the room, allowing him to listen from elsewhere in the house. The room included a private bar, and a red light outside the door warned when Rose was not to be disturbed. Rose carried the sole key to this room around her neck, and Fred installed a separate doorbell to the household which Rose's clients were instructed to ring whenever they visited. Much of the money earned from Rose's prostitution was spent on home improvements.

By 1977, Rose's father Bill had come to tolerate his daughter's marriage, and to develop a grudging respect for Fred. Together, he and Fred opened a café they named The Green Lantern, which was soon insolvent. By 1983, she had given birth to eight children, at least three of whom had been conceived by clients. Fred willingly accepted these children as his own and falsely informed them the reason their skin was darker than that of their siblings was because his great-grandmother was a black woman.

Domestic violence
When each of the West children reached the age of seven, they were assigned numerous daily chores to perform in the house; they were seldom allowed to socialise outside the household perimeters unless either Fred or Rose were present, and had to follow strict guidelines imposed by their parents, with severe punishmentalmost always physicalbeing the penalty for not conforming to the household rules. The children feared being the recipients of violence from their parents, the vast majority inflicted by Rose, occasionally by Fred. The violence was sometimes irrational, indiscreet or just inflicted for Rose's gratification; she always took great care not to mark the children's faces or hands in these assaults. Heather, then her younger brother Stephen (born 1973), both ran away from home; they returned to Cromwell Street after several weeks of alternately sleeping rough or staying with friends, and both were beaten upon their return. Between 1972 and 1992, the West children were admitted to the casualty units of local hospitals thirty-one times; the injuries were explained as accidents and never reported to social services.

On one occasion, as Stephen was mopping the kitchen floor with a cloth, Rose accidentally stepped into the bowl of water he had been using. In response, Rose hit the boy over the head with the bowl, then repeatedly kicked him in the head and chest as she shouted: "You did that on purpose, you little swine!" On another occasion, Rose became furious about a missing kitchen utensil, then grabbed a knife she had been using to cut a slab of meat, repeatedly inflicting light scour marks to Mae June's chest until her rib cage was covered with light knife wounds. All the while, Mae screamed, "No, Mum! No, Mum!" as Stephen and Heather stood by, helplessly sobbing.

On one occasion in August 1974, Rose chased after Fred with a carving knife in her hand; Fred was able to slam shut the door of the room into which he had run as Rose lunged at him with the knife, resulting in the knife embedding itself in the door, and three of Rose's fingers sliding down the blade, almost severing them from her hand. In response, Rose calmly wrapped her hand in a towel and said: "Look what you done, fella. You've got to take me to the hospital now."

Initial sexual assaults

Anna Marie West
In September 1972, the Wests led eight-year-old Anna Marie to the cellar at 25 Cromwell Street, where the child was ordered to undress, with Rose tearing her dress from her body upon noting the child's hesitation. She was then stripped naked, bound to a mattress and gagged before Fred raped her with Rose's active encouragement. After the rape, Rose explained to the child: "Everybody does it to every girl. It's a father's job. Don't worry, and don't say anything to anybody." Making clear these sexual assaults would continue, Fred and Rose then threatened the child with severe beatings if they ever received word she had divulged the sexual abuse she endured at their hands.

Rose occasionally sexually abused the girl herself, and later took extreme gratification in degrading her with acts such as binding Anna Marie to various items of furniture before encouraging Fred to rape her, and forcing her to perform household chores while wearing sexual devices and a mini-skirt. Fred and Rose forced Anna Marie into prostitution from the age of 13, telling clients she was 16. Rose was always present in the room when these acts occurred to ensure the girl did not reveal her true age. On one occasion when Anna Marie was aged 13 or 14, Rose took her to a local pub, insisting she drink several glasses of barley wine. Several hours later, Fred arrived at the pub to collect Rose and Anna Marie. Once they had left the premises, Anna Marie was bundled into her father's van and beaten by Rose, who asked her: "Do you think you could be my friend?" before she was sexually abused by her father and stepmother.

Caroline Owens
In October 1972, the Wests hired 17-year-old Caroline Owens as their children's nanny. They had picked her up one night on a secluded country road as she hitchhiked from Tewkesbury to her Cinderford home, having visited her boyfriend. Learning that Owens disliked her stepfather and was looking for a job, Fred and Rose offered her part-time employment as a nanny to the three children then in their household, with a promise she would be driven home each Tuesday. Several days later, Owens moved into 25 Cromwell Street, sharing a room with Anna Marie, whom Owens noted was "very withdrawn".

Rose, who had begun to engage in prostitution by this time, explained to Owens that she worked as a masseuse when the younger woman enquired about the steady stream of men visiting her. When Owens herself became the recipient of the Wests' overt sexual advances, she announced her intentions to leave Cromwell Street and return home.

Knowing Owens's habits of hitchhiking along the A40 between Cinderford and Tewkesbury, the Wests formulated a plan to abduct her for their shared gratification. Fred later admitted that the specific intent of this abduction was the rape and likely murder of Owens, but that his initial incentive was to determine whether his wife would be willing to at least assist him in an abduction. On 6 December 1972, the couple lured Owens into their vehicle with an apology for their conduct and the offer of a lift home. Initially, Owens believed the Wests had been sincere in their apologies to her and obliged, believing she had simply mistaken their earlier intentions. Rose joined her in the back seat, with the explanation she wanted a "girls' chat" as Fred drove.

Shortly thereafter, Rose began to fondle her, as Fred questioned whether she had had sex with her boyfriend that evening. When Owens began to protest, Fred stopped the car, referred to Owens as a "bitch", and punched her into unconsciousness before he and Rose bound and gagged her with a scarf and duct tape. In her subsequent statement to police, Owens stated that, at Cromwell Street, she was given a drugged cup of tea to drink, then again gagged and subjected to a prolonged sexual assault from the Wests. When Owens screamed, Rose again smothered her with a pillow and further restrained her about the neck, and performed cunnilingus on her. Realising the gravity of her situation, Owens ceased resisting their sexual assaults.

The following morning, having noted Owens's screaming when one of his children had knocked on the door of the room in which she was restrained, Fred threatened that he and his wife would keep her locked up in the cellar and allow his "black friends" to abuse her, and that when they had finished, he would bury her body beneath "the paving stones of Gloucester". Fred then claimed he had killed hundreds of young girls, adding that Owens had primarily been brought to the house for "Rose's pleasure". He and Rose then calmly asked Owens whether she would consider returning to work as their nanny. Seeing her escape avenue, Owens agreed, and vacuumed the house to indicate her belief in becoming an extended member of the family. Later that day, Owens escaped from a launderette she and Rose had entered and returned home. Although initially too ashamed to divulge to her mother what had happened, when her mother noted the welts, bruises and exposed subcutaneous tissues on her daughter's body, Owens burst into tears and confided what had happened.

Owens's mother immediately reported her daughter's ordeal to the police, and the Wests were arrested and charged with assault, indecent assault, actual bodily harm, and rape. The case was tried at Gloucester Magistrates Court on 12 January 1973, but by this date, Owens had decided she could not face the ordeal of testifying in court. All charges pertaining to her sexual abuse were dropped, and the Wests agreed to plead guilty to the reduced charges of indecent assault and causing actual bodily harm; each was fined £50, and the couple were allowed to walk free. When Owens heard this news, she attempted suicide.

Investigation and arrest
On 6 August 1992, Fred was arrested after being accused of raping his thirteen-year-old daughter three times, and Rose was arrested for child cruelty. This case against them collapsed on 7 June 1993 when their daughter refused to testify in court. All five of the Wests' younger children were removed from their custody to foster homes. This case brought to light the disappearance of Heather, who had not been seen since 1987 and triggered the major investigation that followed.

After police found human remains and apparent signs of torture at 25 Cromwell Street, Rose, along with Fred, was arrested in February 1994. During her trial, Rose denied murdering any of the victims. Rose told the jury that her husband committed the criminal acts alone, and she denied participating. Rose claimed to have tried to stop one of the sexual assaults her husband committed. Rose continued to profess ignorance of her husband's murderous activities but the circumstantial evidence that mounted against them was considered sufficient to prosecute her for ten murders: those of the young women whose bodies were found at Cromwell Street, and of Charmaine West. Fred was charged with two further murders committed before his association with Rose.

After his arrest in February 1994, Fred confided to his appropriate adult, Janet Leach, that Rose had murdered Shirley Robinson and had assisted in her dismemberment, personally removing Robinson's foetus from the womb in the process. Another body found at Cromwell Street was that of the Wests' daughter, Heather, who was murdered in June 1987 at the age of 16, after being abused by her parents all her life. Her dismembered body was placed under their family's patio. It is said that Heather began to tell her friends about the abuse occurring in her home. Barry, her younger brother, would later describe watching, as a seven-year-old, his mother kick Heather repeatedly in the head until she was no longer moving. The Wests told friends and concerned parties that she had left home to work at a Devonshire holiday village and on one occasion, fabricated a phone call, supposedly from Heather, to allay her siblings' suspicions regarding their sister's disappearance. Fred would even taunt his children when they misbehaved by jokingly stating, "If you don't behave, you'll end up under the patio like Heather." This was the last known murder that the pair committed.

While on remand at HM Prison Birmingham, Fred killed himself by hanging on 1 January 1995.

Trial
At pretrial proceedings in February, Rose pleaded not guilty to ten charges of murder (the murder of Charmaine West having been added to the original nine after Fred's suicide, and two counts of rape and indecent assault of young girls having been dropped with a view for later resubmission) though her counsel conceded that circumstantial evidence indicated Rose's willingness to subject young girls to sadistic physical and sexual abuse. Her trial at Winchester Crown Court began on 3 October, with Mr Justice Mantell and a jury. An important early decision by the judge was to admit testimony related to the sexual assault of three women by Fred and Rose, accepting the prosecution's argument that it established a pattern of behaviour repeated in the murders.

Prosecution
In his opening statement, prosecutor Brian Leveson portrayed Fred and Rose as sadistic sex-obsessed murderers, terming the bodies discovered at Cromwell Street and Midland Road "secrets more terrible than words can express... [The victims'] last moments on Earth were as objects of the depravity of this woman and her husband". He pointed out that Fred was incarcerated when Charmaine was killed; claimed that Fred and Rose had each learned from their mistake in allowing Caroline Owens to live (they "would never be so trusting again"); and said that the gag on victim Thérèse Siegenthaler evinced a "feminine" toucha scarf tied in a bow. Leveson promised to demonstrate Rose's controlling and sexually sadistic character and her efforts to deflect suspicion about the disappearance of their victims.

Prosecution witnesses included Cromwell Street lodgers; victims' relatives; Rose's mother Daisy and sister Glenys; and surviving victims including Anna Marie West, Kathryn Halliday (a former lover of Fred and Rose), Caroline Owens, and a "Miss A" (who had been sexually assaulted at age 14 by Fred and Rose in 1977, and who described Rose as the more aggressive perpetrator of the two). Neighbours described Charmaine's 1971 disappearance while Fred was imprisoned, and Rose's casual indifference to Heather's disappearance. Rosemary's counsel, Dick Ferguson, tried to discredit prosecution witnesses as either having financially exploited their connection to the case or motivated by grudges. Owens, though admitting to receiving £20,000 for her story, described her extreme survivor's guilt: "I only want to get justice for the girls who didn't make it. I feel like it was my fault."

Defence testimony
Ferguson emphasised that Fred, before meeting Rose, had committed at least one murder strikingly similar to those at issue in the present trial, and that the prosecution's case was largely circumstantial. He contended that Rose was unaware of the extent of Fred's sadism and urged the jury to not be prejudiced by her promiscuity and domineering manner.

Against the advice of her counsel, Rose herself testified; her affect sometimes morose and tearful, sometimes upbeat and humorous. She wept while describing herself as a victim of child abuse and rape who naively married a violent and domineering man, but joked about issues such as her "always being pregnant", and laughed while describing one victim's "grandfather glasses". Rose also claimed never to have met six of the victims buried at Cromwell Street, and to recall very little of her assault on Owens. When shown photographs of the victims buried in the cellar and of victim Alison Chambers, and asked by Brian Leveson whether she recognised any of their faces, Rose's face turned bright red and she repeatedly stuttered as she replied, "No, sir."

When questioned as to life at Cromwell Street, Rose claimed she and Fred had lived separate lives, which was inconsistent with the earlier testimony of witnesses who had visited or lodged at their address. In reference to her relationship with her eldest child, Rose admitted her relations with Heather were strained before claiming to the court that her daughter was a lesbian who had physically and psychologically abused her siblings. Despite these allegations, Rose stated she had loved her daughter and held no knowledge of her murder. Further questioned as to the contradictory explanations she and Fred had given as to Heather's disappearance, Rose claimed these discrepancies had stemmed from telephone conversations she had had with Heather after she had left home.

The defence next called a succession of women who claimed to have been attacked or assaulted by a lone male whose physical description matched that of Fred between 1966 and 1975. These seven women each testified they had recognised their attacker as Fred when his photograph appeared in the media in 1994. The intention of this testimony was to illustrate to the jury that Fred was capable of abducting, assaulting or attempting to attack women without Rose, which the prosecution had never disputed. The physical recollections of several of these women varied greatly.

The final witness at Rose's trial was Fred's appointed appropriate adult, Janet Leach, whom the prosecution had called to testify on 7 November, in rebuttal to the tape recordings of Fred's confession which had been played to the court on 3 November and in which he had stressed Rose had "known nothing at all" about any of the murders. Leach testified that through this role, Fred had gradually begun to view her as a confidante, and had confided in her that on the evening prior to his 25 February arrest, he and Rose had formed a pact whereby he would take full responsibility for all the murders, many of which he had privately described to her as being "some of Rose's mistakes". Fred had further divulged that Rose had indeed murdered Charmaine while he had been incarcerated, and had also murdered Robinson. Fred had also confided that he had dismembered the victims, and Rose had participated in the mutilation and dismemberment of Robinson, having personally removed her child from her womb after her death. In reference to the remaining eight murders for which Rose was charged, Leach testified that Fred had confided Rose had "played a major part" in these murders.

Upon cross-examination, Leach did concede to Ferguson she had earlier lied under oath about having sold her story to a national newspaper for £100,000, although she was adamant as to the sincerity of her testimony. While delivering this testimony, Leach collapsed, and the trial was adjourned for six days. She returned to complete her cross-examination on 13 November.

Conviction
After seven weeks of evidence the judge instructed the jury, emphasising that circumstantial evidence can be sufficient for a finding of guilt, and that if two people take part in a murder the law considers them equally guilty regardless of which of them did the deed. On 21 and 22 November, the jury returned unanimous guilty verdicts for all ten murders. Terming her crimes "appalling and depraved", Mr Justice Mantell sentenced Rose to life imprisonment, emphasising that she should never be paroled. The Lord Chief Justice later decided that she should spend at least twenty-five years in prison, but in July 1997, Home Secretary Jack Straw subjected Rose to a whole life tariff. This was the second instance of a whole life tariff imposed on a woman in the UK in modern times, the first being serial killer Myra Hindley in 1990.

Incarceration
Initially, Rose was incarcerated at HM Prison Bronzefield in Middlesex as a Category A prisoner; she was later transferred to HM Prison Low Newton in County Durham before, in 2019, being transferred to HM Prison New Hall in West Yorkshire.

Almost immediately after being found guilty, Rose lodged an appeal against her ten murder convictions with the Court of Appeal, claiming that her husband (who had confessed to police during questioning that he had murdered up to thirty people) had committed the murders single-handedly, restating her claims that she had also been victimised by Fred and that she tried to prevent one of the sexual assaults. On 18 March 1996, however, the Court of Appeal refused to consider her application for an appeal to be heard.

In September 2001, Rose announced her intention not to appeal against her convictions, while maintaining her innocence.

According to the 2020 TV documentary Rose West & Myra Hindley: Their Untold Story with Trevor McDonald, Rose and Myra Hindley "grew close in jail, bonding over their similar crimes, then had an affair, which cooled as they became rivals to be 'prison royalty'."

See also
 Philip Smith, fellow multiple killer who was a former neighbour of the Wests
 List of serial killers in the United Kingdom

References

Bibliography

Further reading

External links

BBC report of West's conviction
CourtTV Crime Library- Fred and Rosemary West
Transcript of police interview

1953 births
1971 murders in the United Kingdom
1973 murders in the United Kingdom
20th-century English criminals
20th-century English people
20th-century English women
British female serial killers
Crime in Gloucester
Criminal duos
Criminals from Devon
English female prostitutes
English murderers of children
English people convicted of indecent assault
English people convicted of murder
English prisoners sentenced to life imprisonment
English rapists
English serial killers
Filicides in England
Living people
People convicted of murder by England and Wales
People educated at Cleeve School
People from Bishop's Cleeve
People from Gloucester
People from Torridge District
Prisoners sentenced to life imprisonment by England and Wales
Torture in England